John D. Cummins (1791 – September 11, 1849) was an American lawyer and politician who served as a U.S. Representative from Ohio for two terms from 1845 to 1849.

Life and career 
Born in Pennsylvania in 1791, Cummins attended the public schools, and was graduated from Jefferson College, Canonsburg, Pennsylvania, in 1834.
He studied law.

He was admitted to the bar and commenced practice in New Philadelphia, Ohio.
He served as prosecuting attorney of Tuscarawas County from 1836 to 1841.

Congress
Cummins was elected as a Democrat to the Twenty-ninth and Thirtieth Congresses (March 4, 1845 – March 3, 1849).

Death
He died in Milwaukee, Wisconsin, while attending a session of the circuit court, September 11, 1849.

References

1849 deaths
People from New Philadelphia, Ohio
County district attorneys in Ohio
Washington & Jefferson College alumni
Democratic Party members of the United States House of Representatives from Ohio
1791 births
19th-century American politicians